Alienoid is a 2022 South Korean science fantasy action film directed by Choi Dong-hoon, starring Ryu Jun-yeol, Kim Woo-bin, and Kim Tae-ri. The film depicts an extraordinary story that unfolds as the gates of time open between late Goryeo and the present in 2022, when aliens appear. It was released on July 20, 2022, in IMAX and 4DX formats.

Plot 
The plot of the movie takes place in 3 timelines as explained below. The timelines will be explained linearly instead of the interwoven pattern in the film.

Timeline 1: 1380 A.D.
The film opens with the narrator explaining that Aliens have been locking up their criminals for a long time inside human bodies and humans were unaware of this. In this timeline, monk warriors try to kill an Alien and its host human woman to no avail. Suddenly a portal opens and a jeep arrives. A flying robot takes form from the jeep and another Humanoid robot emerges from the vehicle, named Thunder and Guard respectively. Guard battles the Alien, who has now returned to its human host body and is successfully able to extract the Alien from its Host. The woman, before succumbing to her battle injuries asks Guard to take care of her baby; but Guard informs her they can't interfere in human affairs. Guard and Thunder both then take their human forms and leave this timeline using The Crystal Knife, which is the source of their powers and which also helps them see through time and space to help them catch escaped Aliens.

Timeline 2: 2012 A.D.
Guard and Thunder return to their intended timeline, where the Narrator explains that Aliens keep escaping their human hosts across time and space, and it was Guard's and Thunder's jobs to track, extract and recontain them. Unbeknownst to Guard though, Thunder secretly took the dead woman's baby and brought it to this timeline. Guard reluctantly agrees to keep her and they proceed to make a mission report. Here it is revealed that the next Alien Prisoners Convoy is set to arrive in 10 years and 8 months, so they have to stay on Earth until at least then.

Ten years pass. It is 2022 now. The baby, Yian is grown up and Guard (in his human form) pretends to be her father. He has kept the existence of Thunder and his other life a secret from her, though Yian is highly suspicious of this. Thunder informs Guard that the next Prisoner Convoy will finally be arriving within 18 hours at a hospital and will require 107 human hosts. Yian hears this and in the absence of Guard attempts to communicate with Thunder, where he finally appears before her and explains to her that he and Guard came from a far away planet to carry out their duties here. Upon her insistence he informs her that she was brought from 646 years ago into the present.
The next day, Yian heads to the hospital to record proof of the Alien transference. A spaceship arrives and implants the alien prisoners inside the humans but Yian narrowly escapes after recording the entire scenario. Guard and Thunder bring her back home where they promise to explain everything to her. Thunder tells her that they've been locking up their planet's prisoners in humans for ages, and by doing so they get trapped inside the bodies until the human dies and destroys the Alien too. He also tells her that the Aliens can leave their human prisons and take their true form for about 5 minutes, since Earth's atmosphere is too unsuitable for the Aliens to stay out any longer. Such Aliens are called Paros and in case they awaken, it was Guard and Thunder's jobs to contain them before anyone else got hurt.
The next day, Thunder receives an emergency message stating that a spaceship of armed and escaped alien prisoners is heading for Earth, and that the urgent recovery of a trapped prisoner is required. The person they have to catch is Detective Moon Doseok who was at the hospital during the alien transference. Guard, Thunder and Yian rush to catch Detective Doseok before the Aliens can get to him.
Moon Doseok feels something is wrong and tries to escape but the Alien from the ship (nickname- Reddo) catches up to him and explains that the leader of the Rebel Aliens, The Controller, has been locked inside him and that he must free him from Doseok's body. Guard catches up to them and battles Reddo, where he manages to steal The Crystal Knife from Guard and escapes in his ship to catch Doseok. Thunder informs Guard that the Paro inside Doseok is the Leader of the Rebellion against imprisonment in humans and they must stop his Awakening. Reddo finally catches up to Doseok and despite Guard's efforts to stop him, manages to awaken The Controller, by plunging the Crystal Knife into Doseok's body. Meanwhile, Reddo, in his battle with Guard fatally injures him to the point where Thunder has to emergency recharge Guard and manages to bring his power levels back up temporarily. Once awakened, The Controller takes his true form and heads to his spaceship, with Thunder on his tail. Once inside, Thunder informs Guard that The Controller plans to unleash Haava, mysterious spheres containing their Homeplanet's atmosphere on Earth, which will result in Earth's atmosphere becoming perfectly breathable to the Aliens and hence they wouldn't require human bodies to survive. Thus all prisoners could be awakened and unleashed at once and the humans would die due to the new toxic atmosphere. Guard rushes to stop The Controller and manages to reverse the Haava release and seal it back safely but not before 2 doses of Haava are released. Despite the destruction and chaos the Haava causes, Thunder and Yian manage to escape safely, while Guard flies the Haava-spaceship back to their house to lure the Aliens in there. In the Haava infested zone, The Controller meets up with two more Aliens and the three hijack an ambulance to get their Haava-spaceship back. Once home, Guard reveals to Yian that it was he who killed her mother in the past to extract the Alien out of her and the only reason he agreed to raise her was so he could blend among the humans without notice. He then orders Thunder to take her away to safety from the impending fight.
The three Aliens arrive at Guard and Thunder's home where they overpower Guard but Thunder arrives just in time on Yian's requests to return and help her father. Despite their collective efforts though, they realize they cannot stop them. Thus Guard decides to switch times in order to keep the Aliens away from the Haava-spaceship and opens up a portal to the past, where he, Thunder and Yian crash land with the 3 Aliens close in tow.

Timeline 3: 1381 A.D.
A party of 4 humans are on a hilltop when they see a portal open and "a strange carriage fall from the sky"- The Magistrate, Dual Mages of Mount Samgak, and Dogturd. They witness this and ask their servant boy to stay there and leave to see the crash for themselves.
When they crash, Guard asks Thunder to take them back and leave the Aliens in this timeline but Thunder seems to be fatally wounded and is unable to help. The Controller finds them and battles Guard, almost killing him, before Yian shoots and fatally wounds Doseok, The Controller's host. While he tries to grab Yian he accidentally pushes her and Thunder off a cliff into the river below. Yian loses The Crystal Knife while Thunder converts into his ship form and asks her to find him again so they can "fix this". His host fatally injured, The Controller becomes desperate for a new human body and goes off to find one. Meanwhile, Yian washes ashore and is found by the servant boy who helps her and tells her his name is Mureuk. They camp together but Mureuk sets out to investigate whether the area is safe or not. He stumbles upon The Controller nearby, who transfers himself into Mureuk's body. Mureuk doesn't remember this or any event after. 
Ten years pass. It is 1391 now. Mureuk has grown into a young Magic learner who possesses a magic fan with his two loyal companions, Right Paw and Left Paw. He is a bounty hunter who one day gets a bounty to find a certain "Heavenly Knife". He takes on the bounty and decides to go talk to Dogturd who tells him that one day a strange knife washed up in one of the fishermen's nets with mystical properties. It was supposedly invulnerable. He then tells him that knife was bought by The Magistrate a long time ago. Mureuk finds the Magistrate but realizes another strange man is after the Knife too. In the ensuing battle, Dogturd, takes the Knife and runs away while The Strange Man fatally wounds the Magistrate and goes off in pursuit of Dogturd himself. Mureuk chases the Man too but finds himself simply outmatched. When he comes to near the riverbank, he sees a weird looking glowing rock jutting out of the water. It is in fact Thunder in his ship form, probably lying dormant without his power source, The Knife. Mureuk also discovers a strange veiled woman near the ship who flees immediately.
Meanwhile, The Dual Mages of Mount Samgak are investigating the scene where The Magistrate was murdered and The Knife was stolen. They decide to go to The Monk Guru at Milbon Temple for further counsel. Mureuk gathers from the locals the address where the Strange Man lived and goes there to investigate. There he sees pictures of spaceships and aliens and Thunder. He also sees a bounty notice ordering the search for The Knife, and the notice is stamped by The Milbon Temple. At the temple, the Dual Mages inform the Guru that Dogturd has stolen the Knife and enlist the help of The Milbon Temple to find the Knife together. Mureuk on his search for The Knife follows Dogturd to a wedding where he meets a young woman called Lee Ahn, wielding a gun and wearing a watch. She is Yian grown up 10 years later. She is also looking for The Knife, possibly to revive Thunder and get back to her timeline. Before she could steal the Knife, The Dual Mages arrive and hypnotize the owner of the storehouse to bring them the Knife. Lee Ahn rushes to fight them and successfully manages to steal the Knife from them. In an effort to take back the Knife, both the Mages get themselves cut on the Blade, allowing Lee Ahn to escape, but she is knocked out by the Monk Guru, who takes The Knife for himself, and takes an unconscious Lee Ahn prisoner.
When Lee Ahn wakes up, the Monk Guru comes to meet her who reveals he is in fact one of the Aliens who came into this timeline along with her and tells her he only needs to find the ship now in order to get back. It is later shown The Strange Man and The Monk Guru, both being Aliens are waiting to find their leader, The Controller to finally try to get back. They plan on doing so by locating the last human who saw them the day they came in this timeline, Dogturd; since The Magistrate was struck by the Knife and wasn't awakened and the Dual Mages were cut by the blade but they weren't awoken too. The Monk Guru then receives a report that the ship was confirmed to have resurfaced. Having both The Knife and The Ship now, The Aliens only need their Leader to move ahead with their plan to get back. Since the Mages and Lee Ahn served no use to him now, The Monk Guru orders that poisoned food be served to them. Lee Ahn apparently dies and Mureuk decides to steal The Knife for his bounty. He then realizes the food was poisoned and rushes some of the Mages' antidote to Lee Ahn who he saves in time, but not before being seriously wounded by the Monk Guru himself. Lee Ahn is sealed in a coffin which she escapes from, and Mureuk is dumped in the river, where he resurrects miraculously, owing partially to his magic abilities and partially to the Controller's powers. Meanwhile, The Dual Mages investigate the Monk Guru's chambers to find out why he wanted them dead. There they find his destroyed records and realize he's been looking for the fourth human who saw the portal. Now having been double crossed by The Monk Guru, The Mages join forces with Lee Ahn and Mureuk and together the four of them battle the two Aliens. During the battle, Lee Ahn is able to take the Knife and lure one of the Aliens away while the other Alien is killed by forcing him out of his human host for more than five minutes. Lee Ahn manages to escape her pursuer Alien while in the end of the film it is revealed to the others that Mureuk was the host of The Controller all along.

Cast 
 Ryu Jun-yeol as Mureuk, a clumsy master swordsman and Taoist who tries to acquire a new sword.
 Kim Woo-bin as Guard, a supernatural being who manages and escorts alien prisoners.
 Kim Tae-ri as Lee Ahn, a woman who shoots thunder. She travels all over the country to find the new sword while carrying a pistol.
 Choi Yu-ri as young Lee Ahn 
 So Ji-sub as Moon Do-seok, a detective who is chased by aliens.
 Yum Jung-ah as Heug-seol, a mage from Samgaksan.
 Jo Woo-jin as Cheong-woon, a mage from Samgaksan.
 Kim Eui-sung as Ja-jang, a masked man who wants the divine sword.
 Lee Hanee as Min Gae-in, a woman who is curious about the identity of the Guard 
 Shin Jung-geun as Right King, a follower of Mureuk.
 Lee Si-hoon as Left King, a follower of Mureuk.
 Yoo Jae-myung as Hyun-gam 
 Ji Kun-woo as Suiter, a man who appears in a modern suit in the Goryeo Dynasty.
 Kim Hae-sook as an old woman in Goryeo.
 Kim Dae-myung as Thunder (voice), a robot managing alien prisoners. 
 Jeon Yeo-been as Hong Eon-nyeon, a woman with an alien prisoner trapped in her body.
 Shim Dal-gi as bride who is replaced by Lee Ahn.
 Yoon Byung-hee as a shaman who fights against Muruk.
 Kim Ki-cheon as Gaeddongi, a man who knows the location of the divine sword.
 Yoon Kyung-ho as a patient at Jisan Hospital
 Ok Ja-yeon as a doctor at Jisan Hospita

Production

Development and pre-production 
The film was shot as one but will be released in two sequential parts. Ryu Jun-yeol and Kim Tae-ri stars in both parts while Kim Woo-bin and So Ji-sub appears only in the first part. 
Due to the complexity and the length of the narrative, Choi Dong-hoon spent two and half years writing the script, pre-production took a year and 13 months went to filming. Choi revealed that while writing the script, he had specific actors in mind, and to his surprise, all of his envisioned stars accepted their roles.

While Choi Dong-hoon was in charge of screenplay and direction, Jang Young-gyu and 	Kim Tae-kyung were in charge of music and cinematography respectively. Yoo Sang-seop and Ryu Seong-cheol served as martial arts directors. Two art directors, Ryu Seong-hee and Lee Ha-jun, participated in the project; Ryu in charge of  Goryeo setting and Lee in charge of the present day. Dexter Studio was in charge of the CG.

Filming 
Filming began in March 2020. Both first and second part were filmed simultaneously for 13 months. Filming concluded in April 2021. Filming reportedly took place in Andong, North Gyeongsang Province. Production cost of making the two parts was estimated to be 40 billion won.

Release

Alienoid was released on July 20, 2022, in IMAX and 4DX formats in South Korea by CJ E&M. Well Go USA acquired North American rights to distribute the film.

The film was selected as the closing film at the 21st New York Asian Film Festival, where it was screened at Lila Acheson Wallace Auditorium, Asia Society on July 31 for its North American premiere. It is also invited to the 26th Fantasia International Film Festival and will be screened for its Canadian Premiere on August 1, 2022.

The film was made available for streaming on Netflix from December 28, 2022.

Reception

Critical response
The film received a mixed reception from South Korean film critics; some praising the unique worldview Alienoid presented, while others pointing out the potential for confusion in terms of its characters and lore and the distraction caused by mixing too many different elements. However, many audiences seemed to appreciate the director's attempt to create something new. Alienoid was frequently compared with director Choi Dong-hoon's previous film Jeon Woo-chi: The Taoist Wizard (2009) which deals with similar concepts of Taoists and time travel.

Kim Soo-young in her review for Korea Economic Daily stated that despite it feels bit burdensome and awkward at the beginning to accept the vast worldview of two completely different times and spaces, each busy following the narrative within it, the story flows smoothly in the latter part, creating a strong sense of immersion. Jo Hyun-na of Cine21 wrote that the characters, settings and production designs such as space ships lacked novelty, but praised the performance of actors. Choi Young-joo writing for No Cut News praised the director for his ability to combine different genres calling it "a challenge that should be taken at least once" though it seems excessive at times. My Daily'''s Kim Nara wrote that despite having powerful cast, the film didn't meet expectations of the audience, and the director Choi Dong-hoon's own distinct color which was shown in his previous works is rarely seen in Alienoid. Won Jong-bin of Oh My News called the film "disappointing" in terms of film's rhythm, characters, narrative, and setting, but praised the performance of actors, especially those who played characters in Goryeo Dynasty. Kim Boram writing for Yonhap News praised the performance of Ryu Jun-yeol, Kim Woo-bin and Kim Tae-ri, but stated that the story seems "cut and dried."

Box office
The film was released on 1959 screens on July 20, 2022. The opening recorded 158,162 admissions and topped the South Korean box office. The film surpassed 1 million admissions in 7 days of release. , it is the 9th highest-grossing Korean film of 2022 with gross of US$11.2 million and 1.5 million admissions according to the Korean Film Council.

The film became a box-office failure, due to high production cost which required about 7 million (South Korean) admission to cross the break-even point.

 Sequel 
In June 2022, while promoting Alienoid'' Choi Dong-hoon hinted "While Part 1 follows characters in the present-day era who go back in time to the Goryeo Kingdom, Part 2 will center on ancient Taoists traveling through time and space in an effort to obtain the divine sword." The second installment is scheduled for release in 2023.

Accolades

References

External links
 
 
 
 
 

2022 films
2020s South Korean films
2020s Korean-language films
2022 science fiction action films
2020s fantasy action films
2020s historical fantasy films
South Korean science fiction action films
South Korean fantasy action films
South Korean science fantasy films
Films about time travel
Films about extraterrestrial life
Films set in 2022
Films set in the 14th century
Films set in the Goryeo Dynasty
Alien visitations in films
CJ Entertainment films
IMAX films
4DX films
ScreenX films
Films directed by Choi Dong-hoon
Films shot in North Gyeongsang Province
Films set in 2012